Laguja is a small village in Nõo Municipality, Tartu County, Estonia.

As of 1 January 2005, there were 33 residents and 16 active households in Laguja

References

External links 
 Weather at Laguja
 Nõo Municipality

Villages in Tartu County